Jen Lee (born July 26, 1986) is an American ice sled hockey player. He was a member of the United States national team that won gold at the 2014, 2018 and 2022 Winter Paralympics.

Career
Lee served as the backup goaltender for the United States, behind starter Steve Cash, at the 2014 and 2018 Winter Paralympics. After the retirement of Cash, Lee was named the starting goaltender for the United States at the 2022 Winter Paralympics. During the 2022 Paralympics, he had three shutouts in his first Paralympics as the starting goaltender. He did not allow a goal in any of his four starts, stopping all 33 shots he faced.

Personal life
Lee had his left leg amputated above the knee after injuring it in a motorcycle accident in 2009. He served in the United States Army as an aircraft mechanic.

References 

1986 births
Living people
American amputees
American sledge hockey players
Paralympic sledge hockey players of the United States
Paralympic gold medalists for the United States
Ice sledge hockey players at the 2014 Winter Paralympics
Para ice hockey players at the 2018 Winter Paralympics
Para ice hockey players at the 2022 Winter Paralympics
Medalists at the 2014 Winter Paralympics
Medalists at the 2018 Winter Paralympics
Medalists at the 2022 Winter Paralympics
Paralympic medalists in sledge hockey
U.S. Army World Class Athlete Program
United States Army soldiers